Minersville Reservoir is a reservoir in Beaver County, Utah, United States.

History
Minersville Reservoir was created in 1914 by the construction of the Rocky Ford dam, an Embankment dam to impound water from the Beaver River which heads in the Tushar Mountains for use in agriculture.

Geography
The shoreline consists of some private land, but is mostly public BLM-administered land.

Activities
The reservoir is popular for year-round fishing, camping, boating, waterskiing, and tubing.

References

External links

Reservoirs in Utah
Lakes of Beaver County, Utah
Buildings and structures in Beaver County, Utah